The Provisional Consultative Assembly was a governmental organ of Free France that operated under the aegis of the French Committee of National Liberation  (CFLN) and that represented the resistance movements, political parties, and territories that were engaged against Germany in the Second World War alongside the Allies.

Established by ordinance on 17 September 1943 by the CFLN, it held its first meetings in Algiers, at the Palais Carnot (the former headquarters of the Financial Delegations), between 3 November 1943 and 25 July 1944. On 3 June 1944, it was placed under the authority of the Provisional Government of the French Republic (GPRF), which succeeded the CFLN. Restructured and expanded after the liberation of France, it held sessions in Paris at the Palais du Luxembourg between 7 November 1944 and 3 August 1945.

Background 

In North Africa, where most of the population had been gained at the expense of Pétain and Vichy and where the administration, the army, the censors and the press were full of Pétainists, Charles de Gaulle and the French Committee of National Liberation were frequently challenged by Anglo-Saxon diplomats about their legitimacy as local representatives.

Consequently, it was deemed important to nourish in the colonies the anti-Vichy sentiment which was stifled in France: hostility to the German occupiers and their collaborators. It was necessary to bring out representatives of the resistance and all parties and unions uncompromised by collaborationism.

Representative body 

In order to ensure the best possible representation of the French people, four categories of members were assigned as delegates to the Consultative Assembly: delegates from the Resistance in metropolitan France, from the overseas Resistance, from the Senate and the Chamber of Deputies, and from the General Councils of territories of Free France (Algeria and overseas territories). Their numbers were modified over the course of the sessions. The ordinance of 6 December 1943, increased the delegation from 84 to 102 representatives.

After the Provisional Government (GPFR) was  transferred to Paris, the number of delegates and the composition of the Consultative Assembly were profoundly modified, in an ordinance of 11 October 1944. By an ordinance of 11 October 1944, the number of delegates was fixed at 248; they were seated from 7 November 1944. The ordinance of 22 June 1945 added a fifth category of membership, reserved for prisoners and deportees returning from Germany: 47 members were appointed in July. They were seated for only a short time, the provisional assembly breaking up on 3 August 1945 to make way for the institutional process of electing constituent deputies. At that point the assembly had 295 members.

Portfolio

Legislative 

 Consultations at the initiative of the French Committee of National Liberation (CFLN):
 The CFLN was required to consult the Assembly on its draft ordinances.
 The opinions of the Assembly had to be mentioned in the references of the adopted texts.
 Consultations at the initiative of the Assembly (Opinions) 
 The opinions initiated by the assembly, by 2/3 of its members, were to be mentioned in the references of the reform proposals addressed to the CFLN.

Political 

During the interventions of the commissioners (ministers) before the Assembly, it was possible for Assembly members to question and challenge them. In this way, the Assembly created a political pressure center on the committee. Thus, even though it was composed of appointed members and was purely consultative, the assembly demonstrated great independence, as well as a strong capacity for criticism and pressure on the CFLN.

Entry into service 

The Consultative Assembly held its first session at the Palais Carnot in Algiers on 3 November 1943. The first consequence of its inauguration was a reconstitution of the French National Liberation Committee (CFLN) on 9 November 1943, taking into account the distribution of the different groups in the Assembly, and also without General Henri Giraud, whose co-presidency of the CFLN had been abolished by an order of 2 October 1943. General de Gaulle was thus in sole control. In this capacity, he addressed the inaugural session of the Assembly.

Reestablishment of democratic principles 

In his speech, de Gaulle gave the body his imprimatur, as providing a means of representing the people of France as democratically and legally as possible under difficult and unparalleled circumstances, until such time as democracy could once again be restored:

As an indication of the importance he attached to it, de Gaulle participated in about twenty sessions of the Consultative Assembly in Algiers. On 26 June 1944, he came to report on the military situation after the D-Day landings, and on 25 July, he was present at its last session on African soil before its move to Paris.

See also 

 Brazzaville Conference
 Allies of World War II
 Charles de Gaulle
 Clandestine press of the French Resistance
 Collaboration with the Axis Powers during World War II
 Empire Defense Council
 Foreign policy of Charles de Gaulle
 Foreign relations of Vichy France
 French Resistance
 French Colonial Empire
 French Fourth Republic
 French Third Republic
 German occupation of France
 Liberation of France
 List of French possessions and colonies
 List of Governors-General of French Equatorial Africa
 Provisional Government of the French Republic
 Pursuit of Nazi collaborators
 Vichy France
 Zone libre

References 

Notes

Citations

Further reading 

 .
 .
 Emmanuel Choisnel, L'Assemblée consultative provisoire (1943-1945) Le sursaut républicain, Paris, L'Harmattan, 2007. 418 p. 
 Michèle Cointet, Histoire des 16. Les premières femmes parlementaires en France, Fayard, 2017. 211 p.

External links 
 Site de l'Assemblée nationale sur cette page d'histoire et ses membres
 Liste des membres des Assemblées consultatives provisoires

 

 

1943 in France
1944 in France
Antisemitism in France
French Ministers of Overseas France
French people of World War II
French Resistance
German occupation of France during World War II
Jewish French history
May 1941 events
Military history of France during World War II
Vichy France
World War II political leaders